Byōbu Rock is a large rock whose seaward face presents a crenulate or irregular shoreline, standing  east of Gobamme Rock on the coast of Queen Maud Land. It was mapped from surveys and air photos by the Japanese Antarctic Research Expedition, 1957–62, and named Byōbu-iwa (folding screen rock).

References 

Rock formations of Queen Maud Land
Prince Olav Coast